Craugastor megalotympanum is a species of frog in the family Craugastoridae. It is endemic to the Sierra de los Tuxtlas range in southern Veracruz state, Mexico.

Its natural habitat is lowland tropical humid rainforest. Despite its whole range being within the Los Tuxtlas Biosphere Reserve, it is suffering from habitat loss.

References

megalotympanum
Endemic amphibians of Mexico
Amphibians described in 1955
Taxonomy articles created by Polbot
Endemic fauna of Los Tuxtlas